Artur Gąsiewski (born 1 November 1973 in Łomża) is a Polish sprinter. At the 2002 European Indoor Championships, he was part of the gold-medalist team in the  relay. In the 2003 IAAF World Indoor Championships, he was part of the bronze medal-winning team in the  relay, although he ran only in the heats.

References 

Living people
1973 births
People from Łomża
Sportspeople from Podlaskie Voivodeship
Polish male sprinters
European Athletics Indoor Championships winners
21st-century Polish people